Deep Winter is a 1985 Icelandic drama film directed by Þráinn Bertelsson. The film was selected as the Icelandic entry for the Best Foreign Language Film at the 58th Academy Awards, but was not accepted as a nominee.

Cast
 Ragnheiður Arnardóttir as Elsa
 María Sigurðardóttir as Unnur
 Hallmar Sigurðsson as Magnús
 Eggert Þorleifsson as Einar
 Tómas Zoëga as Gísli
 Valur Gíslason as Stjórnarformaður
 Tómas Agnar Tómasson as Stjórnarmaður

See also
 List of submissions to the 58th Academy Awards for Best Foreign Language Film
 List of Icelandic submissions for the Academy Award for Best Foreign Language Film

References

External links
 

1985 films
1985 drama films
1980s Icelandic-language films
Films directed by Þráinn Bertelsson
Icelandic drama films